The City of Norwich Aviation Museum is a volunteer-run museum and charitable trust dedicated to the preservation of the aviation history of the county of Norfolk, England.  The museum is located on the northern edge of Norwich International Airport and is reached by road through the village of Horsham St Faith. The museum welcomed its newest exhibit in October 2020 when it received EI-RJN, a 21-year old Avro RJ-85, formerly operated by CityJet.

History
In 2016, a number of aircraft had to be moved to make room for the Northern Distributor Road. Although part of the museum property was given up for the road, the footprint of the museum actually grew slightly due to a land swap.

Collection

Aircraft on display

 Avro RJ85 ‘’EI-RJN / E2351’’ 
 Avro Vulcan B.2 XM612
 Blackburn Buccaneer S.1 XN967 – cockpit section only
 Cessna 401 G-OVNE
 Dassault Mystère IVA 121
 English Electric Canberra B.15 WH984 – cockpit section only
 English Electric Lightning F.53 53-686/53-700
 Evans VP-2 G-BTAZ
 Fokker F27-200 Friendship G-BCDN
 Fokker F27-600P Friendship G-BHMY
 Gloster Meteor F.8 WK654
 Gloster Meteor NF.11 WM267 – cockpit section only
 Handley Page Dart Herald G-ASKK
 Hawker Siddeley Harrier T.4N XW268 – restoration in progress
 Hawker Hunter F.6A XG172 – painted as Royal Air Force XG168
 Hawker Hunter Mk.51 E-409 – painted as Royal Air Force XE683
 Hawker Siddeley Nimrod MRA.2 XV255
 Lockheed T-33 51-6718
 McDonnell Douglas Phantom FGR.2 XV426 – cockpit section only
 SOCATA Rallye MS.880B Rallye G-ASAT
 SEPECAT Jaguar GR.1 XX109
 Supermarine Scimitar – CIM cockpit
 Westland Whirlwind HAR.10 XP355
 Piper PA-23-250 Aztec G-AYMO

Indoor displays

 100 Group Royal Air Force
 The Royal Air Force in Norfolk 
 USAAF Eighth Army Air Force
 The USAAF 2d Air Division
 The USAAF 458th Bombardment Group
 RAF Horsham St Faith
 RAF Marham 
 RAF Coltishall
 RAF Sculthorpe
 RAF Swanton Morley
 No. 68 Squadron RAF
 Norwich Int'l Airport

See also
List of Norfolk airfields

References

External links

Museum website

Aerospace museums in England
Military aviation museums in England
Museums in Norwich